The Wooden Box is a 2006 Spanish-Portuguese black comedy film directed and written by Juan Carlos Falcón in his directorial feature debut which stars Ángela Molina, Elvira Mínguez, Antonia San Juan, Vladimir Cruz, and María Galiana.

Plot 
Set in a Canarian village in 1965, the plot follows Eloísa, a widow who sets a makeshift wake for her deceased husband Don Lucio (with whom all the locals have scores to settle) in the residence of her friend Isabel.

Cast

Production 
The Wooden Box is inspired by  novel Nos dejaron el muerto. It is a Spanish-Portuguese co-production by Aiete-Ariane Films and Oberón Cinematográfica alongside Take 2000, with support from Ayuntamiento de Las Palmas de Gran Canaria, Ayuntamiento de Pájara, Patronato de Turismo de La Palma, and Canarias Cultura en Red. It was shot in the islands of Fuerteventura and La Palma while filming for some indoor footage took place in Madrid.

Release 
The film was selected for screening out of competition at the 51st Valladolid International Film Festival on 27 October 2006. It was theatrically released in Spain on 1 June 2007.

Reception 
Pere Vall of Fotogramas rated the film 3 out of 5 stars, highlighting its looks and the actresses as the best things about the film whilst citing the characters of Vladimir Cruz and Jordi Dauder as the worst things about it.

Javier Ocaña of El País considered that despite a story with almost always promising situations, the black comedy film is flawed because of a mise-en-scène that "is continually stagnant", the editing, and dialogues which are not as fast as they should be, writing that "it is as if Robert Bresson had filmed a script by Luis García Berlanga".

Accolades 

|-
| rowspan = "2" align = "center" | 2007 || Montreal World Film Festival || colspan = "2" | Golden Zenith ||  || 
|-
| 12th Toulouse Spanish Film Festival || colspan = "2" | Golden Violet ||  || 
|-
| align = "center" | 2008 || 17th Actors and Actresses Union Awards || Best Film Actor in a Secondary Role || Vladimir Cruz ||  || 
|}

See also 
 List of Spanish films of 2007

References 

Films set in the Canary Islands
Films set in 1965
2006 black comedy films
Films shot in the Canary Islands
Spanish black comedy films
Portuguese comedy films
2000s Spanish-language films
2000s Spanish films
2006 directorial debut films